Nicholas Eppehimer (born November 20, 1979) is an American-Italian former professional basketball player.

College career
Eppehimer played college basketball at Marist College in Poughkeepsie, New York, before going on to become a professional basketball player in Europe. Eppehimer was a 1,000 point scorer at Marist, and teamed up with another future professional, in Sean N. Kennedy, while there.

Professional career
After Marist, Eppehimer left for Treviso (Pallacanestro Treviso), in the Italian LBA League, where with the team, he won both the regular season and post-season titles in 2003. Treviso also finished as runner-up in the EuroLeague championship that season to FC Barcelona Bàsquet of Spain.

Some of his other professional accomplishments include: making the Swedish League All-Star team and All-Bosman team in 2005, while playing for the Norrköping Dolphins in Norrköping, Sweden. Eppehimer also played professionally with Dinamo Sassari, Italy, and ALM Évreux Basket, France.  He last played for Longwy-Rehon of France.

Personal
Eppehimer is the younger brother of professional basketball player Brett Eppehimer.

References

External links 
 Euroleague.net Profile
  Nick Eppehimer's Eurobasket.com Profile
 Italian League Profile 

1979 births
Living people
ALM Évreux Basket players
American expatriate basketball people in France
American expatriate basketball people in Italy
American expatriate basketball people in Sweden
American men's basketball players
Dinamo Sassari players
The Hill School alumni
Italian men's basketball players
Marist Red Foxes men's basketball players
Norrköping Dolphins players
Pallacanestro Treviso players
Shooting guards
Small forwards